Tarlankak (Dargwa: Тарланкьякь) is a rural locality (a selo) in Mekeginsky Selsoviet, Levashinsky District, Republic of Dagestan, Russia. The population was 28 as of 2010. There are 6 streets.

Geography 
Tarlankak is located 20 km southeast of Levashi (the district's administrative centre) by road, on the Kaprakh River. Mekegi and Aylakab are the nearest rural localities.

Nationalities 
Dargins live there.

References 

Rural localities in Levashinsky District